The UniSport Division 1 Handball Nationals (before: 2018 Australian University Games)  is an annual mixed gender tournament conducted by the UniSport to determine the national champion of Division 1 collegiate handball in Australia. The tournament was held since 2007 and has been held every year since, except the 2020 edition.

Results

Medal count

See also
UniSport Division 2 Handball Nationals

References

External links
UniSport Division 1 Handball Nationals

Handball Division 1
2007 establishments in Australia
Recurring sporting events established in 2007